Statistics of the 1973 Cameroonian Premier League season.

Overview
Léopards Douala won the championship.

References
Cameroon - List of final tables (RSSSF)

1973 in Cameroonian football
Cam
Cam
Elite One seasons